The 2021 Hardcore Justice was a professional wrestling event produced by Impact Wrestling. It took place on April 10, 2021 at the Skyway Studios in Nashville, Tennessee, and aired exclusively on Impact Plus. It was the twelfth event under the Hardcore Justice chronology, the first to be held since the 2015 event, and the first purchase-only event since the 2012 event.

Nine matches were contested at the event. In the main event, Violent By Design (Eric Young, Deaner, Joe Doering and Rhino) defeated Team Dreamer (Eddie Edwards, Rich Swann, Willie Mack and Trey Miguel) in an eight-man Hardcore War match. In other prominent matches, Deonna Purrazzo successfully retained her Impact Knockouts Championship against Jazz in an Old School Rules Title vs. Career match, where Jazz had to retire from in-ring competition, and Tenille Dashwood won a Weapons match to become the number one contender for the Knockouts Championship.

Production

Background 
Hardcore Justice is an annual professional wrestling event produced by Impact Wrestling. In 2005, it was originally introduced as a pay-per-view (PPV) event held by Impact Wrestling (then known as Total Nonstop Action Wrestling, TNA). The first event was held in May 2005 and from 2006 to 2012, they have all been held in August. The event was known as Hard Justice until 2010. In 2013, TNA dropped Hardcore Justice as a pay-per-view event after announcing only four pay-per-view events would take place through the year and it was retained as a special episode of TNA's weekly broadcast of Impact!.

On the Impact! following Sacrifice, Tommy Dreamer came into the office of Impact Executive Vice President Scott D'Amore, saying that Impact has a problem with their Impact World Tag Team Championship being held hostage outside of the promotion for a month. D'Amore stalled him and then reminded him of the upcoming Hardcore Justice event on Impact Plus, and he let Dreamer book the card for the show.

Storylines 
The event featured professional wrestling matches that involved different wrestlers from pre-existing scripted feuds and storylines. Wrestlers portray heroes, villains, or less distinguishable characters in scripted events that build tension and culminate in a wrestling match or series of matches.

On the March 23 episode of Impact, Impact Knockouts Champion Deonna Purrazzo defeated Jazz in a non-title match, with interference from Susan. The following week on Impact, while Purrazzo and Susan were having an interview, Jazz attacked Purrazzo and Susan. Jazz would later go to Tommy Dreamer, demanding that she get her hands on Purrazzo. Dreamer would have the two booked for Hardcore Justice, but before that, talked about how he and Jazz used to be in Extreme Championship Wrestling (ECW) and how they used to have Ultimate Jeopardy matches in ECW. As a match where all participants wager something, Dreamer asked Jazz to put something at stake, while Purrazzo put her championship on the line. Jazz proclaimed that she is willing to put her career on the line for the title, officially making it a Title vs. Career match.

On the March 30 episode of Impact, Dreamer held a meeting of various knockouts, announcing a weapons match for Hardcore Justice, with the winner receiving an opportunity for the Impact Knockouts Championship at Rebellion. Alisha Edwards, Havok, Jordynne Grace, Rosemary, Susan (who would be attacked and replace by Su Yung at the event), and Tenille Dashwood were announced as participants.

On the March 23 episode of Impact, Eddie Edwards kicked The Good Brothers (Doc Gallows and Karl Anderson) out of the locker room, seeing how their friendship with AEW World Champion Kenny Omega, did not make them "one of the boys". Just as they were about to leave, they encountered Decay (Black Taurus and Crazzy Steve), who mocked how The Good Brothers lost both their tag team titles and the respect of the locker room. On the April 8 episode of Impact, a match between Black Taurus and Doc Gallows was scheduled for Hardcore Justice.

It was announced that Hardcore Justice will also play host to a BlindGames match between Jake Something and Brian Myers. Myers has been wearing an eyepatch since January after a match with Fallah Bahh, saw him being "poked" in the eye. On the April 8 episode of Impact, Myers attacked both Something and old friend-turned-enemy Matt Cardona, where he accepted Cardona's offer for a match at Rebellion, but not before pushing Something into the steel steps, which had clipped his eye. The BlindGames match, essentially a blindfold match with hardcore rules, was scheduled not long after.

On the April 8 episode of Impact, Tommy Dreamer booked an eight-man tag team Hardcore War featuring himself and three men of his choosing (revealed as Eddie Edwards, Willie Mack, and Impact World Champion Rich Swann, before Dreamer would be attacked and replaced with Trey Miguel) against Violent By Design (Eric Young, Deaner, Joe Doering, and Rhino). The rules of Hardcore War are as follow:
Two men start alone for five minutes
Every two minutes, a new man appears from alternating teams
The match cannot end until the final man has entered
After all eight men have entered, the match is won by pinfall or submission
There are no disqualifications

Results

Notes

References

External links 
 

2021 Impact Plus Monthly Special events
2021 in professional wrestling
2021 in Tennessee
Events in Nashville, Tennessee
Hardcore Justice
March 2021 events in the United States
Professional wrestling in Nashville, Tennessee